Rudy Abbott Field at Jim Case Stadium is a baseball park in Jacksonville, Alabama. It has been home to the Jacksonville State University Gamecocks baseball team since 1995. The field  has a capacity of 2,020 and is named for former baseball coach Rudy Abbott.

See also
 List of NCAA Division I baseball venues

External links
 Stadium Info

College baseball venues in the United States
Jacksonville State Gamecocks baseball
Baseball venues in Alabama
Buildings and structures in Calhoun County, Alabama
1995 establishments in Alabama
Sports venues completed in 1995